The Memphis Sessions is a compilation album by Scottish pop-rock quartet Wet Wet Wet. Released on 7 November 1988, the album features a number of tracks recorded during the early recording sessions for the band's debut studio album, Popped in Souled Out. The album contains three previously unreleased songs, as well as five alternative versions of songs from Popped in Souled Out.

The album was produced and mixed by Willie Mitchell at Royal Studios in Memphis, Tennessee. The album was originally shelved following the band's signing to Mercury Records, but was later released following the success of Popped in Souled Out. The album reached #3 in the UK Albums Chart.

Track listing

Charts

References

1988 albums
Wet Wet Wet albums
Albums produced by Willie Mitchell (musician)